The Miss Nevada Teen USA competition is the pageant that selects the representative for the state of Nevada in the Miss Teen USA pageant.

Contestants compete in interview, active wear, and evening gown. Winners have most commonly come from Las Vegas since the pageant began in 1983.

Janae McIntosh of Las Vegas was crowned Miss Nevada Teen USA 2022 on May 15, 2022 at South Point Hotel, Casino & Spa in Las Vegas. She will represent Nevada for the title of Miss Teen USA 2022.

Results summary

Placements

 2nd runners-up: Victoria Franklin (1998), Helen Salas (2004), Alexis Smith (2017), Erica Bonilla (2019)
 4th runner-up: Carissa Morrow (2016) 
 Top 10: Kimberly Cannon (1983), Kristen Walthers (1999)
Top 15/16: Ileri Tunrarebi (2009), Britney Barnhart (2018), Janae McIntosh (2022)
Nevada holds a record of 10 placements at Miss Teen USA

Awards
 Miss Congeniality: Janae McIntosh (2022)
 Miss Photogenic: JJ Casper (1990)

Winners

See also
 Miss Nevada USA
 Miss Nevada

References

External links

Official website

Nevada
Women in Nevada